Caprazamycins are chemical compounds isolated from Streptomyces which have some antibiotic activity.

References

Antibiotics